Mississippi Delta may refer to:
 Mississippi Alluvial Plain, the entire alluvial plain of the Mississippi River, from the river mouth to southern Illinois
 Mississippi embayment, the upper two-thirds of the Mississippi Alluvial Plain, between central Louisiana and southern Illinois
 Mississippi Delta, a distinct cultural area in northwest Mississippi state; part of the Mississippi embayment
 Mississippi River Delta, the confluence of the Mississippi River with the Gulf of Mexico in Louisiana
 Mississippi Delta AVA [not outlined on the inset map], an American Viticultural Area including portions of Louisiana, Mississippi, and Tennessee
 "Mississippi Delta" (song), a 1967 song by Bobbie Gentry

See also
 Arkansas Delta
 Delta, Mississippi, a ghost town in the region known as the "Mississippi Delta"